William Robert "Slick" Leonard (July 17, 1932April 13, 2021) was an American professional basketball player, coach and color commentator. He played college basketball for the Indiana Hoosiers, where he was a two-time All-American and a member of their national championship squad in 1953. After playing professionally in the National Basketball Association (NBA), Leonard coached the Indiana Pacers to three American Basketball Association (ABA) championships. He was inducted into the Naismith Memorial Basketball Hall of Fame as a coach in 2014.

Early life

Leonard was born in Terre Haute, Indiana, on July 17, 1932. He attended Gerstmeyer High School. He went on to play collegiate basketball at Indiana University Bloomington, where he hit the game winning free throw to give the Hoosiers the 1953 NCAA championship. While at Indiana, he became a member of Delta Tau Delta International Fraternity. He was named a third-team All-American in 1953 and selected to the second team the following season.

Professional career

Playing career
Leonard was selected by the Baltimore Bullets with the first pick of the second round (tenth overall) of the 1954 NBA draft. He spent most of his seven-year professional playing career with the Lakers (four years in Minneapolis, and one year following the team's move to Los Angeles), followed by two years with the Chicago Packers/Zephyrs). He led the NBA in games played (72) in 1956–57. His best season came in 1961–62, in which he finished sixth in the NBA in assists per game (5.4) and eighth in assists (378). In his final season as a player, he also coached the Zephyrs. The team moved to Baltimore the following year; Leonard coached them for one more year.

Coaching career with the Pacers
Five years after coaching the Bullets, Leonard became the coach of the ABA's Indiana Pacers, a position he held for nearly 12 years – the last four after the franchise moved to the NBA. For a time, he also served as general manager. Leonard led the Pacers to three ABA championships before the ABA–NBA merger in June 1976. However, the Pacers were nearly gutted in order to meet the financial burdens imposed by the merger, and he was never able to put together a winning team during the Pacers' first four years as an NBA team.

Color commentary

Leonard returned to the Pacers in 1985 as a color commentator, first for television with Jerry Baker, then on radio with Mark Boyle on WFNI 1070 AM. His trademark phrase is "Boom, baby!" for a successful three-point field goal by a Pacers player. According to an interview Leonard gave to Carmel Monthly magazine,“BOOM BABY” was hatched when Leonard was coaching the Pacers in the seventh game of the semi-finals of the 1975 American Basketball Association (ABA) playoffs. Denver held a 2-point lead with seconds left, and the Pacers got the ball to George McGinnis in the low post for a potential tying basket. But McGinnis kicked the ball out to a wide-open Billy Keller in the far corner. Game, set, Boom Baby. “Billy drilled it, and I shouted “BOOM BABY,” Leonard recalled.

Later life
Leonard suffered a heart attack on March 13, 2011, shortly after a Pacers' road victory over the New York Knicks. He was later said to be in good condition, but was given an indefinite time to recover, and was filled in for by Pacers TV analyst and former player Austin Croshere.

Leonard was inducted into the Naismith Memorial Basketball Hall of Fame as a coach in 2014. He became the first individual to be inducted into the Indiana University Sports Hall of Fame. He was also a member of the Indiana Basketball Hall of Fame and Indiana Sports Writers and Broadcasters Hall of Fame.

Leonard sustained three falls in 2018. The first in January shattered his left hip, while the second in June resulted in a broken left wrist. After his third fall in late December, he took a hiatus from calling games, before coming back on February 28, 2019. He died on April 13, 2021, at the age of 88.

Head coaching record

|-
| style="text-align:left;"|Chicago
| style="text-align:left;"|
| 42||13||29|||| style="text-align:center;"|5th in Western||—||—||—||—
| style="text-align:center;"|Missed playoffs
|-
| style="text-align:left;"|Baltimore
| style="text-align:left;"|
| 80||31||49|||| style="text-align:center;"|4th in Western||—||—||—||—
| style="text-align:center;"|Missed playoffs
|-
| style="text-align:left;"|Indiana
| style="text-align:left;"|1968–69
| 69||42||27|||| style="text-align:center;"|1st in Eastern||17||9||8||
| style="text-align:center;"|Lost in ABA Finals
|- style="background:#FDE910;"
| style="text-align:left;"|Indiana
| style="text-align:left;"|1969–70
| 84||59||25|||| style="text-align:center;"|1st in Eastern||15||12||3||
| style="text-align:center;"|Won ABA Championship
|-
| style="text-align:left;"|Indiana
| style="text-align:left;"|1970–71
| 84||58||26|||| style="text-align:center;"|1st in Western||11||7||4||
| style="text-align:center;"|Lost in Division Finals
|- style="background:#FDE910;"
| style="text-align:left;"|Indiana
| style="text-align:left;"|1971–72
| 84||47||37|||| style="text-align:center;"|2nd in Western||20||12||8||
| style="text-align:center;"|Won ABA Championship
|- style="background:#FDE910;"
| style="text-align:left;"|Indiana
| style="text-align:left;"|1972–73
| 84||51||33|||| style="text-align:center;"|2nd in Western||11||12||6||
| style="text-align:center;"|Won ABA Championship
|-
| style="text-align:left;"|Indiana
| style="text-align:left;"|1973–74
| 84||46||38|||| style="text-align:center;"|2nd in Western||14||7||7||
| style="text-align:center;"|Lost in Division Finals
|-
| style="text-align:left;"|Indiana
| style="text-align:left;"|1974–75
| 84||45||39|||| style="text-align:center;"|3rd in Western||16||9||9||
| style="text-align:center;"|Lost in ABA Finals
|-
| style="text-align:left;"|Indiana
| style="text-align:left;"|1975–76
| 84||39||45|||| style="text-align:center;"|5th in ABA||3||1||2||
| style="text-align:center;"|Lost in first round
|-
| style="text-align:left;"|Indiana
| style="text-align:left;"|
| 82||36||46|||| style="text-align:center;"|5th in Midwest||—||—||—||—
| style="text-align:center;"|Missed playoffs
|-
| style="text-align:left;"|Indiana
| style="text-align:left;"|
| 82||31||51|||| style="text-align:center;"|5th in Midwest||—||—||—||—
| style="text-align:center;"|Missed playoffs
|-
| style="text-align:left;"|Indiana
| style="text-align:left;"|
| 82||38||44|||| style="text-align:center;"|3rd in Midwest||—||—||—||—
| style="text-align:center;"|Missed playoffs
|-
| style="text-align:left;"|Indiana
| style="text-align:left;"|
| 82||37||45|||| style="text-align:center;"|4th in Central||—||—||—||—
| style="text-align:center;"|Missed playoffs
|- class="sortbottom"
| style="text-align:center;" colspan="2"|Career
| 1,107||573||534|||| ||116||69||47|||| 

Source:

References

External links

 Basketball-Reference.com: Slick Leonard (as coach)
 Indiana Pacers bio

1932 births
2021 deaths
All-American college men's basketball players
American men's basketball coaches
American men's basketball players
Baltimore Bullets (1944–1954) draft picks
Baltimore Bullets (1963–1973) head coaches
Basketball coaches from Indiana
Basketball players from Indiana
Chicago Packers expansion draft picks
Chicago Packers players
Chicago Zephyrs head coaches
Chicago Zephyrs players
Indiana Hoosiers men's basketball players
Indiana Pacers announcers
Indiana Pacers head coaches
Los Angeles Lakers players
Minneapolis Lakers players
Naismith Memorial Basketball Hall of Fame inductees
Player-coaches
Point guards
Sportspeople from Terre Haute, Indiana